The southern groove-toothed moss mouse (Microhydromys argenteus) is a species of rodent in the family Muridae found in Southern Papua New Guinea. As opposed to M. richardsoni, argenteus sp can be differentiated most prominently by its gray-brown pelage.

References

Microhydromys
Rodents of Papua New Guinea
Mammals described in 2010